Karşıyaka Spor Kulübü (English: Karşıyaka Sports Club) also known as Karşıyaka is a Turkish sports club located in Karşıyaka, Izmir. Founded in 1912, they are Izmir's oldest club. Like all others in Turkey; the "SK" suffix refers to sports club, as besides football the club has sports branches in basketball, volleyball, handball, tennis, swimming, sailing, billiards, and bowling. The club's football team currently competes in the TFF Third League,  the fourth tier of the Turkish football league system. The basketball team currently competes in the Turkish Basketball League and the women's volleyball team in the Turkish Women's Second League.

Karşıyaka has a very large fanbase in Northern Izmir, and have a fierce rivalry with Göztepe; the match between the two teams is collectively known as the Izmir Derby. Other rivalries are with Altay and Bucaspor.

Current squad

League participations in football
 Turkish Premier Division: 1958–64, 1966–67, 1970–72, 1987–91, 1992–94, 1995–96
 Turkish First Division: 1964–66, 1967–70, 1972–73, 1980–87, 1991–92, 1994–95, 1996–01, 2003–2016
 Turkish Second Division: 1973–80, 2001–03, 2016–18
 Turkish Third Division: 2018–present

See also

 Pınar Karşıyaka
 Karşıyaka Women's Volleyball Team
 Göztepe-Karşıyaka rivalry

References

External links
Official website
Karşıyaka on TFF.org

 
Football clubs in Turkey
Association football clubs established in 1912
Multi-sport clubs in Turkey
1912 establishments in the Ottoman Empire
Süper Lig clubs